Li Yingying (born February 19, 2000, in Qiqihar, Heilongjiang) is a Chinese volleyball player. She is a member and Outside Spiker/Opposite Spiker of the China women's national volleyball team. On the club level, she plays for Tianjin Bohai Bank.

Awards

Clubs
 2016–2017 Chinese Volleyball League -  Bronze medal, with Tianjin
 2017 National Games of China -  Gold medal, with Tianjin Junior
 2017–2018 Chinese Volleyball League -  Gold medal, with Tianjin
 2018–2019 Chinese Volleyball League -  Silver medal, with Tianjin
 2019–2020 Chinese Volleyball League -  Gold medal, with Tianjin
 2020–2021 Chinese Volleyball League -  Gold medal, with Tianjin
 2021–2022 Chinese Volleyball League -  Gold medal, with Tianjin

Individuals
 2014 Asian Youth Championship "Best Outside Spiker"
 2015 FIVB Volleyball Girls' U18 World Championship "Best Outside Spiker"
 2017 Junior National Games of China "Most Valuable Player"
 2017–2018 Chinese Volleyball League "Most Valuable Player"
 2017–2018 Chinese Volleyball League "Best Scorer"
 2018–2019 Chinese Volleyball League "Best Scorer"
 2019 Asian Club Championship "Most Valuable Player"
 2019 Asian Club Championship "Best Outside Spiker"
 2019–20 Chinese Volleyball League "Best Outside Spiker"
 2020–21 Chinese Volleyball League "Best Outside Spiker"
 2021–22 Chinese Volleyball League "Most Valuable Player"
 2021–22 Chinese Volleyball League "Best Outside Spiker"
 2022–23 Chinese Volleyball League "Most Valuable Player"
 2022–23 Chinese Volleyball League "Best Outside Spiker"

References

2000 births
Living people
Volleyball players from Heilongjiang
Chinese women's volleyball players
Opposite hitters
Outside hitters
Asian Games gold medalists for China
Asian Games medalists in volleyball
Medalists at the 2018 Asian Games
Volleyball players at the 2018 Asian Games
Volleyball players at the 2020 Summer Olympics
Olympic volleyball players of China
21st-century Chinese women